Mobina Heidari is an Iranian karateka. She won the silver medal in the women's 68kg event at the 2021 Islamic Solidarity Games held in Konya, Turkey.

She won one of the bronze medals in the girls' 59kg event at the Summer Youth Olympics held in Buenos Aires, Argentina. In 2021, she won the silver medal in her event at the Asian Karate Championships held in Almaty, Kazakhstan.

She won one of the bronze medals in her event at the 2022 Asian Karate Championships held in Tashkent, Uzbekistan.

Achievements

References

External links 

 

Living people
Year of birth missing (living people)
Place of birth missing (living people)
Iranian female karateka
Karateka at the 2018 Summer Youth Olympics
Islamic Solidarity Games medalists in karate
Islamic Solidarity Games competitors for Iran
21st-century Iranian women